Tous les Jours (stylized TOUS les JOURS) is a South Korean bakery franchise owned by CJ Foodville, a business group of CJ Group. Tous les Jours means 'every day' in French.

Tous les Jours is a "French-Asian-inspired" bakery primarily serving a selection of baked goods and beverages. As of 2021, it has more than 1,650 locations worldwide.

History 
Tous les Jours was established in 1996, with the first store opening in Guri, South Korea in September 1997. The company established a frozen dough facility in Um-Sung, South Korea in November 1997, starting mass production and distribution. In September 1998, the Tous Les Jours company began franchise licensing to the public.

Tous les Jours opened its 100th store in April 1999, and its 300th store in June 2001. In May 2002, the stores began offering
coffees, sandwiches, fruit juices, and other beverages in addition to baked goods. The company switched to a "café-style bakery business model" in January 2003.

In April 2004, Tous les Jours opened its first store in the United States. In August 2005, it opened its first store in China. In June 2007, it opened its first store in Ho Chi Minh City in Vietnam.

Tous les Jours opened its 1000th store in July 2008.

On November 11, 2011, Tous les Jours opened its first store in the Philippines and on December 16, 2011, it opened its first store in Indonesia in Jakarta.

On November 3, 2012, Tous les Jours opened its first store in Cambodia.

On June 23, 2013, Tous les Jours opened its first store in Malaysia in Kuala Lumpur. By April 2015, Tous les Jours had over 160 stores outside of Korea, in China, the United States, Vietnam, Indonesia, Cambodia, Malaysia and Mongolia.

On May 25, 2017, Tous les Jours abruptly announced the closure of all four stores in Malaysia.

Controversy 
On November 21, 2019, a Tous les Jours store in Pacific Place, South Jakarta, Indonesia, was accused of discrimination for not allowing non-Islamic holiday messages (such as those relating to Christmas, Valentine's Day and Chinese New Year) to be written on an ordered cake.

References

External links
 Tous les Jours official website 
 Tous les Jours USA website
 Tous les Jours Cambodia website 

Bakeries of South Korea
CJ Group
1996 establishments in South Korea